Major-General Russell Upcher   (3 February 1844 – 1937) was a British Army officer who served as colonel of the Durham Light Infantry.

Military career
Educated at Harrow School, Upcher was commissioned as an ensign in the 67th Regiment of Foot on 21 November 1862. He commanded the British troops at the Battle of Quintana in February 1878 during the 9th Xhosa War and commanded the 1st Battalion of the 24th Regiment of Foot in the aftermath of the Battle of Isandlwana in January 1879 during the Anglo-Zulu War. He also served in the Third Anglo-Burmese War in 1885 before becoming General Officer Commanding the 5th and 68th Regimental Districts and then retiring on 3 September 1902. He was also colonel of the Durham Light Infantry.

References

British Army major generals
1844 births
1937 deaths
People educated at Harrow School
Companions of the Order of the Bath
Companions of the Distinguished Service Order
British Army personnel of the Anglo-Zulu War
67th Regiment of Foot officers
British military personnel of the Third Anglo-Burmese War